Mahasena or Mahāsena may refer to:
Mahasena, a name for Murugan, Hindu god of war
Mahasena of Anuradhapura, a historical king of Sri Lanka who ruled from 275 to 301 CE.
Mahasena, a legendary king of the Kataragama region in Sri Lanka said to have ruled during the 6th century BCE.
Mahasena-gupta, a ruler of the Later Gupta dynasty in India
Mahasena (genus), a genus of bagworm moth
Chaophraya Mahasena, a Thai noble title
Mahasena, the former HMCS Orkney, a ship of the Royal Ceylon Navy

See also
Mahasen (disambiguation)